American actress, singer, and director Bella Thorne has appeared in a variety of films, television shows, video games, and music videos throughout the duration of her career. Beginning her career in the film industry, Thorne has appeared in 35 films (including two documentaries and four films as a voice actor), three television films, and two short films. Additionally, she has directed one film and executive produced another.

Thorne has had leading roles on several television shows including My Own Worst Enemy (2008), Little Monk (2009), Big Love (2010), Shake It Up (2010-2013), and Famous in Love (2017–2018).

Outside of film and television, Thorne has lent her voice to three video games, appeared in one stage play, and directed a series of music videos for herself and other musicians.

Film

Television

Video games

Music videos

References

Thorne, Bella